Plesiothalassius is a genus of flies in the family Dolichopodidae. It is found along sandy sea coasts in South Africa. It contains three described species. It is closely related to Amphithalassius.

Species
 Plesiothalassius capensis (Smith, 1972)
 Plesiothalassius flavus Ulrich, 1991
 Plesiothalassius natalensis Ulrich, 1991

References

Dolichopodidae genera
Parathalassiinae
Diptera of Africa
Endemic insects of South Africa